Henry Rugg (1625–1671) was an Anglican priest in Ireland in the second half of the 17th century.

Rugg was born in Gloucester and educated at Magdalen College, Oxford. He was  Dean of Cloyne from 1661 until his death.

Notes

Alumni of Magdalen College, Oxford
Deans of Cloyne
17th-century Irish Anglican priests
1625 births
1671 deaths
People from Gloucester